West Jakarta is one of the five administrative cities of the Special Capital Region of Jakarta, Indonesia. West Jakarta is not self-governed and does not have a city council, hence it is not classified as a proper municipality. It had a population of 2,281,945 at the 2010 Census and 2,434,511 at the 2020 Census. The administrative center of West Jakarta is at Puri Kembangan.

West Jakarta is bordered by Tangerang Regency and North Jakarta to the north, Central Jakarta to the east, South Jakarta to the south, and Tangerang city to the west.

History 

West Jakarta is famous for its Dutch colonial relics such as Town Hall Building (now Jakarta History Museum in Jakarta Old Town), Chinatown (Glodok) and also a number of old churches, mosques, and fortresses of early Dutch colonization in Batavia at that time.

Districts 
West Jakarta is subdivided into eight districts (kecamatan), listed below with their areas and their populations at the 2010 Census and according to the mid-2019 official estimates:

Economy 
After South Jakarta, West Jakarta is now designed to become a new business district for the Jakarta area and beyond. Particularly in Kembangan district, malls, entertainment centers, shopping centers, office centers, hospitals and schools has been built. This area becomes a strategic area because it is passed by the circuit of Outer Ring Road Jakarta (Jalan Lingkar Luar Jakarta).

Education

School system 
Like the rest of the city, public school system are available in West Jakarta. State schools such as SDN 01, SDN 03, SMPN 45, SMPN 169, SMPN 22, SMPN 32, SMAN 57, SMAN 65 and many more are located at West Jakarta. Private schools, that may be based on religion, such as Christian-based Bukit Sion International School, BPK Penabur Schools, and Islamic-based school such as Al-Azhar are also located on West Jakarta.

Colleges and universities 
West Jakarta is a home to numerous college and universities, such as Bina Nusantara University, Mercu Buana University, Trisakti University, Tarumanagara University, Podomoro University, and many more. The Telkom Institute of Technology Jakarta, a private university, was established in 2021 (formerly Jakarta Telkom Academy - 2002).

Tourism

Museums 
As Jakarta Old Town is located on West Jakarta, West Jakarta boosts some of the most famous museums of Jakarta such as Jakarta History Museum, Wayang Museum, and Museum Bank Indonesia. Recently, Museum MACAN has also opened at West Jakarta.

Temple
 Shri Sanathana Dharma Aalayam (Tamil:ஸ்ரீ சனாதன தர்ம ஆலயம்ஸ்), first Dravidian architecture Hindu Temple in Jakarta

Shopping malls 

 Central Park Jakarta and Neo-Soho
 Mall Taman Anggrek
 Mall Puri Indah
 Lippo Mall Puri and PX Pavilion @ St. Moritz
 Mall Daan Mogot
 Mall Taman Palem
 Season City

Gallery

References

External links

 Official site